

Fitch's Bridge is a wooden covered bridge over the West Branch of the Delaware River. It is in the town of Delhi and is one of 24 covered bridges in New York State. It was originally erected in 1870 in the village of Delhi, and moved to its present location in 1885.

It was added to the National Register of Historic Places in 1999.

Gallery

See also
List of bridges on the National Register of Historic Places in New York
List of covered bridges in New York
National Register of Historic Places listings in Delaware County, New York

References

External links

 Fitch's Bridge, at New York State Covered Bridge Society
 Fitches Bridge, at Covered Bridges of the Northeast USA 

Covered bridges on the National Register of Historic Places in New York (state)
National Register of Historic Places in Delaware County, New York
Bridges completed in 1870
Wooden bridges in New York (state)
Tourist attractions in Delaware County, New York
Bridges in Delaware County, New York
Road bridges on the National Register of Historic Places in New York (state)